Gary O'Connor (born 7 April 1974) was a Scottish football goalkeeper.

He retired on Tuesday 4 May 2010, having been given a game in Raith's last game of the season at home to Ross County to say goodbye 3 days earlier.

References

External links 

London Hearts profile

Living people
Sportspeople from Midlothian
Scottish footballers
Scottish Football League players
English Football League players
Association football goalkeepers
Heart of Midlothian F.C. players
Berwick Rangers F.C. players
Doncaster Rovers F.C. players
Partick Thistle F.C. players
Cowdenbeath F.C. players
East Fife F.C. players
Raith Rovers F.C. players
1974 births
Dalkeith Thistle F.C. players
East Stirlingshire F.C. players
Newtongrange Star F.C. players
Scotland youth international footballers